

Highest-grossing films 

The list has more 2019 films in the top 50 than any other year, with nine in total. It is then followed by 2015, 2016, 2017, and 2018 with six; 2012 with five; 2013 with four; 2010 and 2011 with three; and 2014 with two. Figures are given in United States dollars

Highest-grossing film per year 
Disney strongly dominated the box office, especially in the latter half of the decade.

Most acclaimed films 

On Rotten Tomatoes, the following six films of the 2010s received 100% critics' ratings.

 The Tale of the Princess Kaguya (2013)
 Summer 1993 (2017)
 Leave No Trace (2018)
 Minding the Gap (2018)
 Honeyland (2019)

Metacritic listed the following as the top ten highest rated films (at the time of their release) of the 2010s.

  Boyhood
  Moonlight
  Roma
  Manchester by the Sea
  12 Years a Slave
  Gravity
  Parasite
  Portrait of a Lady on Fire
  Carol
  The Social Network

Metacritic also listed the following films as most mentioned on critic's lists of the best films of the 2010s.

  Mad Max: Fury Road
  Moonlight
  The Social Network
  Get Out
  Under the Skin
  The Tree of Life
 (Tie) Inception and Inside Llewyn Davis
  Boyhood
  The Master

According to They Shoot Pictures, Don't They?, a site which numerically calculates reception among critics, the most acclaimed films of the 2010s are:
  The Tree of Life
  Uncle Boonmee Who Can Recall His Past Lives
 Holy Motors
 Mad Max: Fury Road
 Toni Erdmann
 A Separation
 Boyhood
 Melancholia
 The Turin Horse
 Moonlight
 Under the Skin
 The Social Network
 Amour
 The Master
 The Act of Killing
 Phantom Thread
 Parasite
 Inside Llewyn Davis
 Once Upon A Time in Anatolia
 Carol

Den of Geek listed the following as the top ten best movies of the decade.

 Parasite
 Inception
 Mad Max: Fury Road
 Get Out
 Her
 Ex Machina
 Spider-Man: Into the Spider-Verse
 Hereditary
 The Social Network
 Star Wars: The Last Jedi

Rolling Stone magazine listed the following as the top ten best movies of the decade.

 Moonlight
 The Social Network
 Holy Motors
 Boyhood
 Get Out
 Toni Erdmann
 The Master
 Roma
 Mad Max: Fury Road
 Carol

Indiewire listed the following as the top ten best movies of the decade.

 Moonlight
 Under the Skin
 Certified Copy
 The Act of Killing
 Inside Llewyn Davis
 Holy Motors
 Carol
 The Master
 Mad Max: Fury Road
 Lady Bird

In 2016, BBC's 100 Greatest Films of the 21st Century poll of film critics listed the following as the top ten best films of the 2010s so far.

 Boyhood
 The Tree of Life
 A Separation
 Inside Llewyn Davis
 The Act of Killing
 Holy Motors
 Mad Max: Fury Road
 The Grand Budapest Hotel
 The Master
 The Social Network

In 2017, The New York Times list of "The 25 Best Films of the 21st Century So Far" selected the following as the best films of the 2010s so far.

 A Touch of Sin
 Inside Out
 Boyhood
 Inside Llewyn Davis
 Timbuktu
 In Jackson Heights
 White Material
 Mad Max: Fury Road
 Moonlight

List of films

See also 
 
 Film, History of film, Lists of films
 List of animated feature films of the 2010s
 Popular culture: 2010s in music

References 

 
Films by decade
Film by decade
2010s decade overviews